HM Prison Inverness, also known as Porterfield Prison, is located in the Crown area of Inverness, Scotland, and serves the courts of the Highlands and Islands. It covers all the courts in the Western Isles as well as courts from Fort William, Wick and Elgin. A small local prison, it deals with inmates serving up to 4 years, with female prisoners serving up to 2 years. Its capacity is 103 prisoners. The establishment is Governed by Brian McKirdy.

Redevelopment plans
As of 2016, due to insufficient capacity at HMP Inverness, the Scottish Prison Service announced its intention to build a new prison near Milton of Leys.

In June 2016 after significant opposition from local residents (HAPPL Campaign) the Scottish Prison Service suspended the consultation on the Milton of Leys site to assess an alternative option.

In 2021, the Scottish Government confirmed its intention to proceed with a new HMP Highland to replace HMP Inverness, shortlisting four major construction companies for the contract.

References

Address: HMP Porterfield, Duffy Drive, Inverness, Highland, IV2 3HH

Prisons in Scotland
Buildings and structures in Inverness
1902 establishments in Scotland
Government agencies established in 1902
Execution sites in Scotland